Kuan may refer to:

Ethnic groups
Khuen people, an aboriginal people of Laos
Khün, a Tai ethnic group in southeast Asia

Other uses
Fan Kuan (990–1020), Chinese landscape painter of the Song dynasty
Lee Kuan Yew (1923–2015), founding father of Singapore, prime minister 1959–1990
Agam Kuan, an ancient well in India
Dhaula Kuan, major intersection of roads in Delhi, India

Television
KUAN-LD, a low-power television station (channel 17, virtual 48) licensed to serve Poway, etc., California, United States

See also
Guan (disambiguation)
Guang (disambiguation)